Thumper or The Thumper may refer to:

In arts and entertainment

Film and television 
 Thumper (Disney), a rabbit in the Disney animated film Bambi
 Thumper (Dune), a mechanical device in the science fiction novel Dune
 Thumper (film), a 2017 crime thriller by Jordan Ross 
 Thumper (Thomas the Tank Engine), a quarry driller in Thomas the Tank Engine and Friends
 Thumper, Hopper's pet grasshopper in A Bug's Life
 Thumper, a character in the James Bond film Diamonds Are Forever
 Thumper, a character in the television show Veronica Mars

Gaming
 Thumper (video game), a 2016 rhythm game by Drool
 Thumper, a character from the Twisted Metal video game series
 Coal thumper, a building from the Frostpunk computer game.

Literature
 Thumper (Dune), a mechanical device in the science fiction novel Dune

Music
 Thumper (EP), a 1990 EP by Man in the Wood
 "Thumper" (song), a 2010 song by band Enter Shikari
 "Thumper", a song by Raging Speedhorn on the album Raging Speedhorn
 The Thumper, a 1960 album by Jimmy Heath

Places
 Thumpertown Beach, Massachusetts, United States

Technology
 Thumper (motorcycle), a four-stroke single cylinder motorcycle
 Project Thumper, the earliest official anti-ballistic missile study
 M79 grenade launcher (nickname Thumper)
 Sun Fire X4500, storage server (code name Thumper)
 Thumper, a collecting pot placed along the vapor-carrying line before the worm of a pot still
 Thumper, one of the two Avro Lancaster bombers in flying condition, in the BBMF Museum at Coningsby RAF station
 Thumper, a small arms ammunition concept popularized by gun writer Jeff Cooper

Other uses
 Bible thumper, Christian fundamentalists (normally considered derogatory)
 Thumper (magic trick), a device used in a variety of magic tricks
British Rail Class 205, Nicknamed “thumpers” due to their engine sound.